The Conococheague Formation is a mapped Appalachian bedrock unit of Cambrian age, consisting primarily of limestone and dolomite. It occurs in central Maryland, southern and central Pennsylvania, the Valley and Ridge of Virginia and easternmost West Virginia.

Description

Depositional environment

The depositional environment of the Conococheague was most likely shallow marine to tidal on a carbonate platform.

Notable Exposures
The type section is located at Scotland in Franklin County, Pennsylvania (northeast of Chambersburg).

Accessible outcrops occur along various roadcuts and waterways in the area, including roadcuts near mile marker 20 of I-70 near Hagerstown, Maryland.  The bedding at this site is nearly vertical, with the strike nearly perpendicular to the highway, and thus one can easily walk up and down the sections.

The Conococheague also forms dramatic, 100-foot cliffs along the Potomac River upstream of Shepherdstown, West Virginia (northwest of Harpers Ferry), where entrenched meanders expose mile-long sections of tilted Conococheague strata.  These may be easily seen from the towpath trail of the Chesapeake and Ohio Canal National Historical Park along the Maryland bank of the Potomac.  In Shepherdstown itself, the top of a Conococheague cliff provides the setting for the monument to steamboat-inventor James Rumsey.

Fossils
Conodonts are present in the Conococheague.

Thrombolites and the possible chiton Matthevia are present in the Boxley Blue Ridge Quarry in Bedford County, Virginia.

Age
Relative-age dating of the Conococheague places it in the Upper Cambrian period.

References

Generalized Stratigraphic Column for West Virginia

Cambrian United States
Dolomite formations
Limestone formations of the United States
Cambrian geology of Pennsylvania
Cambrian Maryland
Cambrian geology of Virginia
Cambrian West Virginia
Cambrian System of North America
Cambrian southern paleotemperate deposits